Stiven Ricardo Plaza Castillo  (born Esmeraldas, Ecuador, 11 March 1999) is an Ecuadorean professional footballer who plays as a forward for Ecuador champions S.D. Aucas.

Club career

Independiente del Valle
Born in Eloy Alfaro Canton, Plaza started his career with Norte América in 2011, as a left winger. In 2017, after stints at Deportivo Azogues and Aucas, he joined Independiente del Valle and was a regular starter in the club's under-18 squad.

Converted to a forward by Juan Carlos León, Plaza made his senior debut during the 2018 season with Alianza Cotopaxi, the club's reserve team. After scoring 7 goals in 3 games in the 2018 U-20 Copa Libertadores, he was reportedly being watched by scouts of the Premier League sides Manchester City and Manchester United.

Plaza made his professional – and Serie A – debut on 11 June 2018, coming on as a late substitute in a 1–1 away draw against Universidad Católica. He scored his first goal on 12 August, netting his team's third in a 3–1 home win against Emelec.

On 23 October 2018, Plaza scored a brace in a 2–0 away defeat of Técnico Universitario.

Valladolid
On 10 December 2018, Spain's Real Valladolid confirmed a pre-contract with Plaza to join the club once the transfer window opened on 1 January 2019. Then, Plaza made his debut with Valladolid on 16 February 2019, in a 1–0 away loss against Barcelona. On 25 August 2019, Plaza scored his first goal in Europe, helping Real Valladolid Promesas to a 4-1 victory over CD Izarra in a Segunda División B match.

Trabzonspor (loan)
On 17 August 2020, Plaza was loaned to Turkish side Trabzonspor for two seasons. On 26 September 2020, Plaza made his debut with Trabzonspor in 3-1 victory over Yeni Malatyaspor. He appeared in only three official matches with the club.

Independiente del Valle (loan)
After struggling to fulfill his promise, Valladolid loaned Plaza to his former club Independiente del Valle during February 2021.

New York Red Bulls
On 30 August 2022, Valladolid announced the transfer of Plaza to New York Red Bulls. He was initially assigned to New York Red Bulls II. He made his debut for New York Red Bulls II on 31 August 2022, coming on late in the match in a 3-3 draw versus Hartford Athletic. On 10 October 2022, Plaza scored his first goal for New York in a 2-1 loss to Memphis 901 FC.

International career
On 4 October 2018, Plaza was called up by Ecuador manager Hernán Darío Gómez for friendlies against Qatar and Oman. He made his full international debut eight days later, starting in a 4–3 loss against the former at the Jassim Bin Hamad Stadium in Doha.

Career statistics

Club

International

Honours
Ecuador U20
FIFA U-20 World Cup third place: 2019

Individual
U-20 Copa Libertadores top goalscorer: 2018

References

External links

Stiven Plaza profile at Federación Ecuatoriana de Fútbol 

1999 births
Living people
People from Eloy Alfaro Canton
Ecuadorian footballers
Association football forwards
Ecuadorian Serie A players
C.S. Norte América footballers
C.S.D. Independiente del Valle footballers
La Liga players
Segunda División B players
Süper Lig players
Real Valladolid players
Real Valladolid Promesas players
Trabzonspor footballers
New York Red Bulls II players
Ecuador international footballers
Ecuadorian expatriate footballers
Expatriate footballers in Spain
Expatriate footballers in Turkey
Expatriate soccer players in the United States
Ecuadorian expatriate sportspeople in Spain
Ecuadorian expatriate sportspeople in Turkey
Ecuadorian expatriate sportspeople in the United States
Ecuador under-20 international footballers